The 1950–51 League of Ireland was the 30th season of senior football in the Republic of Ireland.

Cork Athletic were the defending champions.

Changes from 1949–50 
No new teams were elected to the League.

Teams

Season overview
Cork Athletic successfully defended their title.

Final classification

Results

Top scorers

Ireland
League of Ireland seasons
1